The women's rugby sevens tournament at the 2018 Commonwealth Games was the first time that women's teams had participated in this event. The venue for the competition was Robina Stadium.

Background

Pool stage
Wales qualified on 9 July 2017 after placing fifth at the 2017 Rugby Europe Women's Sevens Grand Prix Series.

The pools were confirmed on 2 February 2018, scheduling was announced on 23 February 2018.

Participating nations

Competition schedule

The following is the competition schedule for the Women’s Rugby sevens competition:

Pool stage
In pool play, each team plays one match against the other three teams in the group.

The top two teams in each pool advance to the semi-finals and the remaining teams advance to the lower classification matches (for places 5 to 8).

Pool A

Pool B

Knockout stage

Lower classification round

Medal round

Final standing

References

Women's tournament
2018 in women's rugby union
Women's rugby sevens competitions
2018 in Australian women's sport
International women's rugby union competitions hosted by Australia